Lieb's square ice constant is a mathematical constant used in the field of combinatorics to quantify the number of Eulerian orientations of grid graphs. It was introduced by Elliott H. Lieb in 1967.

Definition
An n × n grid graph (with periodic boundary conditions and n ≥ 2) has n2 vertices and 2n2 edges; it is 4-regular, meaning that each vertex has exactly four neighbors. An orientation of this graph is an assignment of a direction to each edge; it is an Eulerian orientation if it gives each vertex exactly two incoming edges and exactly two outgoing edges. 

Denote the number of Eulerian orientations of this graph by f(n). Then

 

is Lieb's square ice constant. Lieb used a transfer-matrix method to compute this exactly.

The function f(n) also counts the number of 3-colorings of grid graphs, the number of nowhere-zero 3-flows in 4-regular graphs, and the number of local flat foldings of the Miura fold. Some historical and physical background can be found in the article Ice-type model.

See also 

 Spin ice
Ice-type model

References 

Mathematical constants
Quadratic irrational numbers